Reynosia is a genus of plant in family Rhamnaceae. Darlingplum is a common name for this genus.

Species include:

 Reynosia jamaicensis M.C.Johnst.

References

 
Rhamnaceae genera
Taxonomy articles created by Polbot